Eurocom (formerly Eurocom Entertainment Software) was a British video game developer founded in October 1988 by Mat Sneap, Chris Shrigley, Hugh Binns, Tim Rogers and Neil Baldwin, to specifically develop games for the Nintendo Entertainment System. Eurocom expanded to several other platforms, including handheld game systems and most major video game consoles. The company was known for its arcade to console ports and games based on licensed properties. They also developed a few original properties, such as Magician, Machine Hunter, 40 Winks, and Sphinx and the Cursed Mummy.

On 23 November 2012, Eurocom laid off around 75% of their 200 employees. On 6 December 2012, the company laid off its remaining staff and ceased operations.

Games developed

1990s

2000s

2010s

Unreleased

References

External links

Defunct video game companies of the United Kingdom
Video game companies established in 1988
Video game companies disestablished in 2012
Video game development companies
Companies based in Derby
Amber Valley
Defunct companies of England
1988 establishments in England
2012 disestablishments in England